3,5'-Di-tert-butylsalicylaldehyde is an organic compound. It is a pale yellow solid. This aldehyde is a building block for preparing salen ligands.

Preparation
This compound is commercially available. It may be prepared by the Duff reaction, from 2,4-di-tert-butylphenol and hexamethylenetetramine:

Reactions
Condensation of this aldehyde with various diamines gives various salen ligands, which are popular for catalysis. For example, the enantiopure ligand for Jacobsen's catalyst may be prepared from the appropriate 1,2-diaminocyclohexane. The catalyst is obtained by further reaction with manganese(II) acetate and atmospheric oxygen in the presence of a chloride source.

References

Hydroxybenzaldehydes
Tert-butyl compounds